Polemonium elegans, the elegant Jacob's-ladder, is a rare species of flowering plant in the phlox family found in the United States.

References

External links
 
 

elegans
Plants described in 1898